Premature ejaculation (PE) occurs when a man expels semen (and most likely experiences orgasm) soon after beginning sexual activity, and with minimal penile stimulation. It has also been called early ejaculation, rapid ejaculation, rapid climax, premature climax and (historically) ejaculatio praecox. There is no uniform cut-off defining "premature", but a consensus of experts at the International Society for Sexual Medicine endorsed a definition of around one minute after penetration. The International Classification of Diseases (ICD-10) applies a cut-off of 15 seconds from the beginning of sexual intercourse.

Although men with premature ejaculation describe feeling that they have less control over ejaculating, it is not clear if that is true, and many or most average men also report that they wish they could last longer. Men's typical ejaculatory latency is approximately 4–8 minutes. The opposite condition is delayed ejaculation.

Men with PE often report emotional and relationship distress, and some avoid pursuing sexual relationships because of PE-related embarrassment. Compared with men, women consider PE less of a problem, but several studies show that the condition also causes female partners distress.

Cause
The causes of premature ejaculation are unclear. Many theories have been suggested, including that PE was the result of masturbating quickly during adolescence to avoid being caught, performance anxiety, passive-aggressiveness or having too little sex; but there is little evidence to support any of these theories.

Several physiological mechanisms have been hypothesized to contribute to causing premature ejaculation, including serotonin receptors, a genetic predisposition, elevated penile sensitivity and nerve conduction atypicalities. Scientists have long suspected a genetic link to certain forms of premature ejaculation. However, studies have been inconclusive in isolating the gene responsible for lifelong PE.

The nucleus paragigantocellularis of the brain has been identified as having involvement in ejaculatory control. Other researchers have noted that men who have premature ejaculation have a faster neurological response in the pelvic muscles.

PE may be caused by prostatitis or as a medication side effect.

PE has been classified into four subtypes - lifelong, acquired, variable and subjective PE. The pathophysiology of lifelong PE is mediated by a complex interplay of central and peripheral serotonergic, dopaminergic, oxytocinergic, endocrinological, genetic and epigenetic factors. Acquired PE may occur due to psychological problems - such as sexual performance anxiety, and psychological or relationship problems - and/or co-morbidity, including Erectile dysfunction, prostatitis and hyperthyroidism.

Mechanism
The physical process of ejaculation requires two actions: emission and expulsion. The emission is the first phase. It involves deposition of fluid from the ampullary vas deferens, seminal vesicles and prostate gland into the posterior urethra. The second phase is the expulsion phase. It involves closure of bladder neck, followed by the rhythmic contractions of the urethra by pelvic-perineal and bulbospongiosus muscle and intermittent relaxation of external urethral sphincters.

Sympathetic motor neurons control the emission phase of ejaculation reflex, and expulsion phase is executed by somatic and autonomic motor neurons. These motor neurons are located in the thoracolumbar and lumbosacral spinal cord and are activated in a coordinated manner when sufficient sensory input to reach the ejaculatory threshold has entered the central nervous system.

Intromission time
The 1948 Kinsey Report suggested that three-quarters of men ejaculate within two minutes of penetration in over half of their sexual encounters.

Current evidence supports an average intravaginal ejaculation latency time (IELT) of six and a half minutes in 18- to 30-year-olds. If the disorder is defined as an IELT percentile below 2.5, then premature ejaculation could be suggested by an IELT of less than about two minutes. Nevertheless, it is possible that men with abnormally low IELTs could be satisfied with their performance and do not report a lack of control. Likewise, those with higher IELTs may consider themselves premature ejaculators, have detrimental side effects normally associated with premature ejaculation, and even benefit from treatment.

Diagnosis
The Diagnostic and Statistical Manual of Mental Disorders, Fifth Edition (DSM-5) defines premature ejaculation as "A persistent or recurrent pattern of ejaculation occurring during partnered sexual activity within approximately 1 minute following vaginal penetration and before the person wishes it," with the additional requirements that the condition occurs for a duration longer than 6 months, causes clinically significant distress, and cannot be better explained by relationship distress, another mental disorder, or the use of medications. These factors are identified by talking with the person, not through any diagnostic test. The DSM-5 allows for specifiers whether the condition is lifelong or acquired, applying in general or only to certain situations, and severity based on the time under one minute, however these subtypes have been criticised as lacking validity due to insufficient evidence.

The 2007 ICD-10 defined PE as ejaculating without control, and within around 15 seconds.

Treatments
Several treatments have been tested for treating premature ejaculation. A combination of medication and non-medication treatments is often the most effective method.

Self-treatment
Many men attempt to treat themselves for premature ejaculation by trying to distract themselves, such as by trying to focus their attention away from the sexual stimulation. There is little evidence to indicate that it is effective and it tends to detract from the sexual fulfilment of both partners. Other self-treatments include thrusting more slowly, withdrawing the penis altogether, purposefully ejaculating before sexual intercourse, and using more than one condom. Using more than one condom is not recommended as the friction will often lead to breakage. Some men report these to have been helpful.

A qualitative clinical trial, conducted by King's College London medical school teaching hospitals, compared use of the Prolong device with cognitive behavioural therapy. Using the Climax Control Training program in 58 subjects was found to delay time to ejaculation from 48 seconds (0.8 minutes) to 8 minutes and 48 seconds (8.8 minutes) on average in 61% of men, compared to 2 minutes and 36 seconds (2.6 minutes) in 40% of men having cognitive behavioural therapy, with a difference on average of 6 minutes and 12 seconds (6.2 minutes) between the two groups.

Sex therapy
Several techniques have been developed and applied by sex therapists, including Kegel exercises (to strengthen the muscles of the pelvic floor) and Masters and Johnson's "stop-start technique" (to desensitize the man's responses) and "squeeze technique" (to reduce excessive arousal).

To treat premature ejaculation, Masters and Johnson developed the "squeeze technique", based on the Semans technique developed by James Semans in 1956. Men were instructed to pay close attention to their arousal pattern and learn to recognize how they felt shortly before their "point of no return", the moment ejaculation felt imminent and inevitable. Sensing it, they were to signal their partner, who squeezed the head of the penis between thumb and index finger, suppressing the ejaculatory reflex and allowing the man to last longer.

The squeeze technique worked, but many couples found it cumbersome. From the 1970s to the 1990s, sex therapists refined the Masters and Johnson approach, largely abandoning the squeeze technique and focused on a simpler and more effective technique called the "stop-start" technique. During intercourse, as the man senses he is approaching climax, both partners stop moving and remain still until the man's feelings of ejaculatory inevitability subside, at which point, they are free to resume active intercourse.

These techniques appear to work for around half of people, in the short-term studies that had been done as of 2017.

Medications
, there are no drugs specifically approved for the treatment of PE. Selective serotonin reuptake inhibitors (SSRIs) are used to treat PE, including fluoxetine, paroxetine, citalopram, escitalopram  or dapoxetine and clomipramine. The opioid tramadol, an atypical oral analgesic is also used. Results have found PDE5 inhibitors to be effective in combination treatment with SSRIs. The full effects of these medications typically emerge after 2-3 weeks, with results indicating about ejaculatory delay varying between 6–20 times greater than before medication. Premature ejaculation can return upon discontinuation, and the side effects of these SSRIs can also include anorgasmia, erectile dysfunction, and diminished libido.

Topical anesthetics such as lidocaine and benzocaine that are applied to the tip and shaft of the penis have also been used. They are applied 10–15 minutes before sexual activity and have fewer potential side effects as compared to SSRIs. However, this is sometimes disliked due to the reduction of sensation in the penis as well as for the partner (due to the medication rubbing onto the partner).

Surgical treatments
Two different surgeries, both developed in South Korea, are available to permanently treat premature ejaculation: selective dorsal neurectomy (SDN) and glans penis augmentation using a hyaluronan gel. Circumcision has shown no effect on PE. The International Society for Sexual Medicine guidelines do not recommend either surgical treatment due to the risk of permanent loss of sexual function and insufficient reliable data and on the basis of violating the medical principle of non-maleficence as the surgery can lead to complications, of which some might not yet be known. The most common complication of surgery is the recurrence of PE, reported to occur in about 10% of surgeries. Other sources consider SDN as a safe and efficient treatment and these surgeries are popular in Asian countries.

Epidemiology
Premature ejaculation is a prevalent sexual dysfunction in men; however, because of the variability in time required to ejaculate and in partners' desired duration of sex, exact prevalence rates of PE are difficult to determine. In the "Sex in America" surveys (1999 and 2008), University of Chicago researchers found that between adolescence and age 59, approximately 30% of men reported having experienced PE at least once during the previous 12 months, whereas about 10 percent reported erectile dysfunction (ED). Although ED is men's most prevalent sex problem after age 60, and may be more prevalent than PE overall according to some estimates, premature ejaculation remains a significant issue that, according to the survey, affects 28 percent of men age 65–74, and 22 percent of men age 75–85. Other studies report PE prevalence ranging from 3 percent to 41 percent of men over 18, but the great majority estimate a prevalence of 20 to 30 percent—making PE a very common sex problem.

There is a common misconception that younger men are more likely to develop premature ejaculation and that its frequency decreases with age. Prevalence studies have indicated, however, that rates of PE are constant across age groups.

History
Male mammals ejaculate quickly during intercourse, prompting some biologists to speculate that rapid ejaculation had evolved into men's genetic makeup to increase their chances of passing their genes.

Ejaculatory control issues have been documented for more than 1,500 years. The Kamasutra, the 4th century BCE Indian marriage handbook, declares: "Women love the man whose sexual energy lasts a long time, but they resent a man whose energy ends quickly because he stops before they reach a climax."  Waldinger summarizes professional perspectives from early in the twentieth century.

Sex researcher Alfred Kinsey did not consider rapid ejaculation a problem, but viewed it as a sign of "masculine vigor" that could not always be cured.  The belief that it should be considered a disease rather than a normal variation, has also been disputed by some modern researchers.

Psychoanalysis
Freudian theory postulated that rapid ejaculation was a symptom of underlying neurosis. It stated that the man has unconscious hostility toward women, so he ejaculates rapidly, which satisfies him but frustrates his lover, who is unlikely to experience orgasm that quickly. Freudians claimed that premature ejaculation could be cured using psychoanalysis. But even years of psychoanalysis accomplished little, if anything, in curing premature ejaculation.

In 1974, there was no evidence found to suggest that men with premature ejaculation harbor unusual hostility toward women.

See also
 Anorgasmia
 Delayed ejaculation
 Edging (sexual practice)
 Pre-ejaculate
 Retrograde ejaculation
Erectile dysfunction
Blue balls
Pull out method
Foreplay

References

Cited sources

Further reading

External links 

Andrology
Male genital disorders
Human penis
Sexual dysfunctions
Ejaculation
Premature events